David Stuart Morrison (born June 12, 1962) is a Canadian former professional ice hockey player who spent parts of four seasons in the National Hockey League with the Los Angeles Kings and Vancouver Canucks between 1980 and 1985 before embarking on a long playing career in various European leagues. He later became an executive with the Toronto Maple Leafs. Morrison was born in Toronto, Ontario.

Morrison is the son of longtime NHL defender Jim Morrison, who appeared in three All-Star Games in the 1950s.

Playing career
As a youth, Morrison played in the 1975 Quebec International Pee-Wee Hockey Tournament with a minor ice hockey team from Mississauga.

Morrison played his junior hockey for the Peterborough Petes and was selected in the second round, 34th overall, in the 1980 NHL Entry Draft by the Los Angeles Kings. He was the second Pete taken by the Kings, who had also drafted Morrison's junior teammate and future Hall of Famer Larry Murphy with their first selection.

Morrison spent two more seasons in Peterborough before turning pro, although his solid development saw him receive brief callups to the NHL in both the 1980–81 and 1981–82 seasons, appearing in a total of 7 games for the Kings. He was also selected to play for Canada in the 1982 World Junior Championships, where he helped his country win their first-ever Gold Medal in that tournament.

In 1982–83, Morrison turned pro and split the season between the Kings and the New Haven Nighthawks of the American Hockey League. He registered 3 goals and 6 points in 24 games in Los Angeles, and added a respectable 23 goals in 59 games on the farm. However, after a slow start to the 1983–84 season, Morrison was released by the Kings and was signed by the Vancouver Canucks. Morrison spent the majority of two seasons playing in the minors in Vancouver's system, playing just 8 games for the club in the 1984–85 season without scoring a point.

Following his release by the Canucks in 1985, Morrison signed on with a German club and would spend the next 14 seasons playing in leagues in Germany, Switzerland, the Netherlands, and Britain. His most successful stint was with the Kassel Huskies of the DEL, where he served as team captain from 1994 through 1997. He also served as captain of the Manchester Storm in England from 1997 until 1999.

Morrison retired as a player in 1999 to take a job as a scout with the Vancouver Canucks. In his career, he appeared in 39 NHL games, recording 3 goals and 3 assists for 6 points along with 4 penalty minutes.

Scouting career
Morrison was hired by the Vancouver Canucks as an amateur scout in 1999 and served in that position until 2004. He joined the Toronto Maple Leafs as an amateur scout in 2004 and served in that role for the team until 2006, when he was promoted to Director of Amateur Scouting. On July 28, 2015, the Leafs announced that Morrison had changed jobs from Director of Amateur Scouting to Director of Pro Scouting, which he held for two years before becoming Director of Player Personnel.

Career statistics

Regular season and playoffs

International

References

External links

1962 births
Living people
Canadian ice hockey forwards
EC Ratinger Löwen players
Eisbären Berlin players
Fredericton Express players
Kassel Huskies players
Los Angeles Kings draft picks
Los Angeles Kings players
Manchester Storm (1995–2002) players
New Haven Nighthawks players
Peterborough Petes (ice hockey) players
SC Herisau players
Ice hockey people from Toronto
Toronto Maple Leafs scouts
Vancouver Canucks scouts
Vancouver Canucks players